Benjamin Wright, Jr. (born July 11, 1946) is an American producer and composer.

As an arranger, he has conducted hits for many artists including Justin Timberlake, OutKast, Brandy, Destiny's Child, Dru Hill, Aretha Franklin, Quincy Jones, James Ingram, Richard Ashcroft, Janet Jackson and Michael Jackson.

Early life
Music director and arranger Benjamin F. Wright, Jr. was born on July 11, 1946, in Greenville, Mississippi. Wright started his music career while in high school, performing as a drum major in the marching band, and singing doo-wop in a group he and his friends started. After high school, Wright embarked on his first major musical tour with big Rhythm and Blues icon, Ted Taylor. During the tour, Wright played piano and sang backup for the band. The Ted Taylor tour allowed Wright to experience music arrangement for the first time. His subsequent success within the industry took him on the road with icons like James Brown, Otis Redding, Billy Stewart and Gladys Knight & the Pips.
 
Shortly after Wright's touring period, he was drafted into the United States Air Force. While there, Wright met Fat's Ford, a trumpet player who played with Duke Ellington. Ford eventually introduced Wright to the Duke — an experience that changed Wright's life forever. After Wright's honorable discharge from the military in Alabama, he worked for several years with Bobby Moore & the Rhythm Aces.

Wright was soon invited to play with Pieces of Peace in Chicago. He would make the move and begin career as a copyist and arranged. During this time, he attended the Chicago Conservatory of Music and received a PhD from the Pentecostal Bible College in Tuskegee, Alabama.

Chicago Era

After meeting up with the Pieces of Peace, he was brought on as a member of Chicago's premier soul and funk bands. Through the 1960s and early 1970s they scored the enviable gig of backing up Syl Johnson for his shows and on his incendiary 1970 LP "Is It Because I'm Black".

The opportunities for Wright seemed to all come from all sides—Chicago's music scene was booming. Pieces of Peace was one of the premier session bands and would record music for Jackie Wilson, The Chi-Lites, Jerry Butler, and Curtis Mayfield and The Impressions, to name a few. Concurrently, he was a copyist for arranging and producer legends: Charles Stepney, Donny Hathaway, Gene Barge, Richard Evans – exposing him to wide range of artists and building a strong relationship with Chess Records, Brunswick Records, Curtom Records, Mercury Records, and various artists across the Chicago music scene.

Eventually Pieces of Peace disintegrated during a tour of Southeast Asia, mostly due to homesickness and pressure over managerial disputes, amongst other things.

Los Angeles Era
With the band disbanding and the industry shifting from Chicago to LA, Wright was ready for a new challenge and moved to LA to expand into producing music. Once moving to LA in 1975, he started working as the music director and producer for The Temptations—being instrumental in their move from Motown Records to Atlantic Records. He wrote a number of songs on their 1976 album The Temptations Do The Temptations. On this album the group enjoyed the greatest creative control of their career. He would also co-write on subsequent albums for the band for years to come.

He also became the musical director for Gladys Knight & The Pips, Aretha Franklin, and Barry White & The Love Unlimited Orchestra.

Wright, would also begin work with Stax Records gospel crossover artist, Rance Allen in 1978, arranging and orchestrating his Top 30 R&B hit, "I Belong to You." Achieving mainstream chart success was a rare occurrence for a gospel act—unseen before Rance Allen's band. The two would continue to collaborate for a number of years, following the song's success.

Then, in 1979 Wright would get one of the most memorable phone calls of his lifetime—Quincy Jones requested that Wright work on Michaels Jackson's breakout solo album Off the Wall. Mr. Wright would go on to arrange the strings for "Rock With You" (US Billboard Hot 100 #1), "Get On The Floor (Dance With Me)," and the GRAMMY Award-winning song "Don't Stop 'Til You Get Enough" (US Billboard Hot 100 #1).

He would receive another GRAMMY that year for the Instrumental Performance on Earth, Wind, & Fire’s iconic hit, "Boogie Wonderland."

He would then have continued chart success in 1980 producing for Tavares’ Supercharged (US R&B Chart #20) and Love Uprising with the songs "Love Uprising" (US R&B #17) and the socio-politically charged "Bad Times" (US R&B #10). He also arranged the horns and strings for Aretha Franklin's 1980 hit "United Together" reaching #3 on the US R&B Charts, subsequently joining Aretha on the road as her music director.

Mr. Wright and Quincy Jones would soon collaborate again in 1981. "One Hundred Ways" performed by James Ingram, written by Wright, Tony Coleman, and Kathy Wakefield would win the GRAMMY Award for Best R&B Vocal Performance. The song would resurrect the album, rising up the charts to #10 Billboard 200 and #3 on the Top R&B Albums.

Between 1982 and 1983, Wright opened the Ritesonian recording studio.

Much like Chicago, the work just continued to pile on quickly. After having worked with Wright on Edmund Sylvers’ solo project, Leon Sylvers III (in-house producer for SOLAR Records) reached out to Wright to arrange music for all of the SOLAR recording artists: Klymaxx, The Whispers ["Keep On Lovin Me" (US R&B #4) and "In The Raw" (US R&B #8)], Lakeside ["Real Love" (US R&B #17)], Shalamar, Midnight Star, Carrie Lucas ["Dance With You" (US Dance #6)], and Dynasty. His work with Dynasty would become a staple in the hip-hop community with the use of his iconic arrangement of the song "Adventures In The Land of Music."

Similarly, he would arrange a number of records for DeBarge on their All This Love and In a Special Way albums.  "All This Love" (1982) would reach #5 on the Billboard R&B chart, #17 on the Billboard Hot 100 and #1 on the Adult Contemporary chart, helping its parent album of the same name reach gold status by the summer of 1983. "Love Me in a Special Way" would also connect with the R&B community reaching U.S. Billboard Hot Black Singles #11. On that same album, Wright arranged what would become an iconic song—"A Dream." Although the track was not released as a single, the song has been popular over the years on the radio and has been sampled by several artists including 2Pac and Blackstreet.

His run continued in the 90s and early 00s working with Tony! Toni! Toné! "Slow Wine" (US R&B #21), Chaka Kahn "Never Miss The Water" (US Dance #1), the debut album for Destiny’s Child, Brandy's album Full Moon (US R&B #1, US Billboard Top 200 #2), Toni Braxton's "Maybe," Dru Hill's "I Love You," DJ Quik's Balance & Options (US R&B #5), Mary Mary "In The Morning" (US Gospel #1), Jamiroquai's album Dynamite (UK Albums Chart #3), Joss Stone's album Introducing Joss Stone (US Billboard Top 200, #2).

In 2004 he would receive a GRAMMY for Album of the Year as part of his contributions to OutKast’s most successful and record setting album Speakerboxxx/The Love Below.  Similarly, he would receive the GRAMMY for Best Pop Vocal Album for his work on Justin Timberlake's solo debut smash, Justified. 2004 would also mark his first trip to conduct the Norwegian Radio Symphony at the Nobel Peace Prize Concert is Oslo, Norway. An honor, he would enjoy again in 2005, when he returned to conduct for Gladys Knight's performance.

The relationship with Justin Timberlake would continue through the subsequent albums, writing for a number of songs, including "Until The End of Time" (US Billboard Hot 100, #17), "Mirrors" (US Billboard Hot 100, #2), "Take Back The Night" (US Billboard Hot 100, #29).

The collaborations continue still. Wright worked with Mystery Skulls in 2014 contributing a number of songs to his debut album Forever (US Dance/Electronic Albums #3). In 2016, he worked with Mary J. Blige, Ty Dolla $ign, Frank Ocean, and a number of projects slated for future releases.

External links
Benjamin Wright Discography at Discogs

References

American male composers
21st-century American composers
Living people
1946 births
Musicians from Greenville, Mississippi
21st-century American male musicians